Azjar is an African region, probably the most ancient Tuareg confederation, with stronghold in the oasis-city of Ghat.

See also
 History of Western Sahara

Sahara
Tuareg